Charley Nordin (born August 16, 1997) is an American rower. He represented the United States at the 2020 Summer Paralympics. According to an interview with Charley, he suffered an accident during his junior year of high school that ended his athletic career in Track & Field due to losing his right calf and gluteal muscles.

“We were out at a lake and I was on a rope swing,” Nordin said. “It was a rope swing I’d gone on 100 times before. It was something I’d always done. Before I made it out over the cliff, like over the water, the rope snapped and I fell, and instead of falling into the water, I fell onto the shore. I had burst fractures in my L3, L4, and L5 vertebrae. As they burst out it partially severed my spinal cord so I have pretty severe nerve damage to my right leg.”

He started his rowing career as a novice walk on at Gonzaga University in Spokane WA.

Career
Nordin represented the United States in the mixed coxed four event at the 2020 Summer Paralympics and won a silver medal.

References

1997 births
Living people
American male rowers
Sportspeople from Alameda, California
Rowers at the 2020 Summer Paralympics
Medalists at the 2020 Summer Paralympics
Paralympic medalists in rowing
Paralympic silver medalists for the United States
World Rowing Championships medalists for the United States